The Emirgan Park ( or rarely Emirgan Parkı) is a historical urban park located at the Emirgan neighbourhood in the Sarıyer district of Istanbul, Turkey, on the European coast of the Bosphorus. It is one of the largest public parks in Istanbul.

History 
In the Byzantine era, the entire area where today the park stretches was covered with cypress trees and known as "Kyparades" or "Cypress Forest". It became known as "Feridun Bey Park", when the uninhabited land was granted in the mid-16th century to Nişancı Feridun Bey, a Lord Chancellor in rank in the Ottoman Empire.

In the 17th century, Ottoman Sultan Murad IV (reigned 1623-1640) presented the estate to Emir Gûne Han, a Safavid Persian commander, who surrendered his sieged castle without any resistance, and followed him back to Constantinople (now Istanbul). The name "Feridun Bey Park" was changed to "Emirgûne", which in time became corrupted to "Emirgan".

During the centuries, the estate's owner changed several times. By the end of the 1860s, Emigran Park was owned by Isma'il Pasha, the Khedive of Egypt and Sudan (reigned 1863-1879). Although Egypt had been virtually independent since 1805, it legally remained a vassal state of the Ottoman Empire, and the Egyptian Khedival family had married into the Ottoman Sultanic family. After he was deposed as Khedive, with the throne of Egypt and Sudan passings to his son, Tewfik Pasha, Isma'il initially took up residence in exile in Naples, before relocating permanently to Emigran Park, where he lived in exile until his death. The area was used as the backyard of a large wooden yalı that Isma'il ordered built on the shore of the Bosphorus. He also built within the park area three wooden pavilions, which still exist.

The heirs of the deposed Khedive sold the estate in the 1930s to Satvet Lütfi Tozan, a wealthy Turkish arms dealer. In the 1940s, he granted the park grounds, including the three pavilions, to the City of Istanbul during the office of Governor and Mayor Lütfi Kırdar (1938-1949).

Present Day Emirgan Park 

Inside the park with two decorative ponds are plants of more than 120 species. The most notable rare trees of the park's flora are: Stone Pine, Turkish pine, Aleppo Pine, Blue Pine, Eastern White Pine, Maritime Pine, Japanese Cedar, Norway Spruce, Blue Spruce, Atlas Cedar, Lebanon Cedar, Himalayan cedar, Beech, Ash tree, Sapindus, Babylon Willow, Hungarian Oak, Colorado White Fir, Maidenhair tree, California incense-cedar, Coast Redwood and Camphor tree.

Many jogging tracks and picnic tables make the Emirgan Park a very popular recreation area for the local people, especially during the weekends and holidays. The three historic pavilions, called after their exterior color as the Yellow Pavilion, the Pink Pavilion and the White Pavilion were restored in time between 1979-1983 by the Touring and Automobile Club of Turkey under its CEO Çelik Gülersoy, and opened to the public as cafeteria and restaurant.

Tulip Festival

The Emirgan Park is closely associated with the tulip, the traditional flower, which gave its name to an era  (1718-1730) of the Ottoman Empire. A special garden was established in Emirgan Park in the 1960s to revive the city's tradition of tulip cultivation. Since 2005, an annual international tulip festival is organized here every April making the park attractive and very colorful with these flowers.

Yellow Pavilion 
The Yellow Pavilion is a large wooden mansion in the form of a chalet built by Khedive Ismail Pasha between 1871-1878 as a hunting lodge and guest house.

It consists of four rooms, one hall and a kitchen in the lower floor and three rooms and one salon in the upper floor. Its layout reflects the architecture of the traditional Ottoman house with a salon encircled by many living rooms. The ornaments at the ceilings and the walls were the work of the court architect Sarkis Balyan. The ceilings are enriched with oil painted flower figures and the facades with outstanding carvings. The high doors and windows, as well as the opulent interior decorations in bright colors reflect the glory of that era. A pond is situated to the northeast, next to the mansion.

Used only by the owners from the very beginning, the pavilion was restored within four months in the beginning of the 1980s with due diligence, furnished with antiques and opened to the public as a cafeteria. The Yellow Pavilion, the main base of the park, is run since 1997 by Beltur, the tourism company of the Metropolitan Municipality of Istanbul. Up to 100 guests can be served at the premise in summer and winter time.

Pink Pavilion 
The Pink Pavilion, one of the three mansions in the park built by Khedive Ismail Pasha, is a two-storey, typical Ottoman house. Named after its exterior's original color of cranesbill flower pink, the pavilion reflects the glory of its history with fine ornaments.

The pavilion is used as a cafeteria on weekends. Furthermore, it is available for conventions and wedding ceremonies. In the summer months, the premise can accommodate up to 350 guests, for cocktails up to 500 people. In the winter time, groups of up to 150 guests can be served.

White Pavilion 
The White Pavilion is the third mansion within the Emirgan Park built by Khedive Ismail Pasha. It is only  far from the Yellow Pavilion. The two-storey wooden building bears the architectural characteristics of the neo-classical style.

The mansion is used in the daytime as a cafeteria and in the evenings as a restaurant of Turkish-Ottoman cuisine.

See also 
 Mihrabat Nature Park

References

External links 

 Emirgan Lifestyle and Places

Parks in Istanbul
Urban public parks
Bosphorus
Sarıyer